Sparganothis unicolorana is a species of moth of the family Tortricidae. It is found in the United States in Alabama, Florida, Louisiana, Maryland, Mississippi, North Carolina and Virginia.

References

Moths described in 2012
Sparganothis